This is a list of songs recorded by Usher. Usher Raymond IV is an American singer and songwriter. He has released 7 studio albums, 9 compilation albums and 52 singles. He has also appeared on 22 albums released by other artists. His songs have been released on other compilation albums, including Disneymania, a compilation of Disney songs covered by popular artists. Usher has recorded songs with other popular artists including Mariah Carey, Justin Bieber, Pitbull, Afrojack and Wiz Khalifa among others. As of 2016, he has recorded more than 150 songs.

List

References

External links
 

Usher